Juan Ernesto Vasquez Araya is a Nicaraguan diplomat who is currently serving as Nicaragua's Ambassador to Armenia, the Russian Federation and the Republic of South Ossetia, with his residence in Moscow.

Career 
Araya is Nicaragua's ambassador to the Russian Federation. In 2015, he was assigned an additional diplomatic portfolio with his appointment as Nicaragua's ambassador to Armenia. He presented his letter of credence to President of Armenia Serzh Sargsyan on November 4, 2015. On July 11, 2016 Araya was appointed Ambassador Extraordinary and Plenipotentiary of Nicaragua to the Republic of South Ossetia.

References 

Nicaraguan diplomats
Year of birth missing (living people)
Ambassadors of Nicaragua to Russia
Ambassadors of Nicaragua to Armenia
Ambassadors of Nicaragua to South Ossetia
Living people